Gwyn Howells  (13 May 191826 July 1997) was a senior Australian public servant, best known for his time as Director-General of the Department of Health.

Life and career
Howells was born on 13 May 1918 in Birmingham, England. He studied at the University of London.

He joined the Department of Health in 1966, as first assistant director-general in charge of the tuberculosis division.

Howells was appointed Director-General of Health in 1973. He left the position on 31 December 1982, five months ahead of his official date of retirement.

Howells died on 26 July 1997.

Awards
In the 1979 Queen's Birthday Honours Howells was appointed a Companion of the Order of the Bath for service as Director-General of the Department of Health.

References

1918 births
1997 deaths
Australian Companions of the Order of the Bath
People from Birmingham, West Midlands
Secretaries of the Australian Government Health Department
British emigrants to Australia